Westgate Mall is an indoor shopping mall located in Amarillo, Texas, United States. It has over 100 mainline stores and 3 anchor stores, two Dillard's locations, with the men's store originally a Mervyn's, JCPenney, with 2 vacant anchor last occupied by Sears and Bealls.

The mall opened in October 1982 and cost $40 million to construct. It is located along Interstate 40.

On December 28, 2018, it was announced that Sears would be closing as part of a plan to close 80 stores nationwide. The store closed in March 2019.

The mall is partially in Potter County, Texas and partially in Randall County, Texas. The county line goes through the JCPenney store.

References
 Amarillo’s Westgate Mall sold to new owners
https://www.amarillo.com/story/news/2022/09/17/amarillo-dillards-fashion-gala-celebrates-westgate-mall-opening/69498811007/

External links
MallCenters
Westgate Mall Website

Shopping malls in Texas
Shopping malls established in 1982
Buildings and structures in Amarillo, Texas
Buildings and structures completed in 1982
Tourist attractions in Amarillo, Texas
Interstate 40
JLL (company)
Namdar Realty Group